Bellator 257: Nemkov vs. Davis 2 was a mixed martial arts event produced by Bellator MMA that took place on April 16, 2021 at Mohegan Sun Arena in Uncasville, Connecticut.

Background 
The event was headlined by two of the Quarterfinals of the Bellator Light Heavyweight World Grand Prix Tournament. The main event featured current Bellator Light Heavyweight World Champion Vadim Nemkov making his first title defense against Phil Davis, a rematch of their November 2018 bout, which saw Nemkov win via split decision. The co-main event was to feature former UFC Middleweight Title contender Yoel Romero facing off against former UFC Light-Heavyweight Title contender Anthony Johnson in their debuts for the promotion. However, on March 26, it was announced that the bout was moved to Bellator 258, with Corey Anderson vs. Dovletdzhan Yagshimuradov being moved from Bellator 256 to serve as the co-main for this event.

Aaron Pico was expected to face Aiden Lee at this event. However, on April 4, Pico had to pull out of the bout due to medical issues. The fight is planned to be rebooked at a later date.

A women's flyweight bout between Veta Arteaga and Desiree Yanez, which was originally scheduled for Bellator 250 in October, was rescheduled for this event.

A catchweight contest at 175 pounds between Paul Daley and Sabah Homasi served as the opening fight of the main card.

At the weigh-ins, Jay Jay Wilson missed weight by .75 pounds and was fined a percentage of his purse.

Results

See also 

 2021 in Bellator MMA
 List of Bellator MMA events
 List of current Bellator fighters
 Bellator MMA Rankings

References 

Bellator MMA events
Events in Uncasville, Connecticut
2021 in mixed martial arts
April 2021 sports events in the United States
2021 in sports in Connecticut
Mixed martial arts in Connecticut
Sports competitions in Connecticut